The 2001 Barbagallo V8 Supercar round was the sixth round of the 2001 Shell Championship Series. It was held on the weekend of 22 to 24 June at the Barbagallo, now Wanneroo Raceway in Perth, Western Australia.

Race report 

Paul Radisich dominated the weekend by grabbing pole position in the top-ten shootout and winning all three races over the weekend. This continued the run of form from the Dick Johnson Racing outfit who had won the previous round of the championship in Canberra.

Race results

Qualifying

Top Ten Shootout

Race 1

Race 2

Race 3

Championship Standings

References

External links 

Barbagallo
Wanneroo Raceway